David V. Evans (born 27 October 1940) is a British applied mathematician noted for his contributions to water waves and acoustics. He is the father of British actress Alice Evans.

Together with John Nicholas Newman, he initiated the International Workshop on Water Waves and Floating Bodies. He is also known for the Bristol cylinder, a wave energy converter. He is currently an emeritus professor of Applied Mathematics at the University of Bristol.

Evans obtained his BSc in mathematics from the University of Manchester in 1962 and his PhD in 1966 under the supervision of Fritz Ursell. After completing his PhD at the University of Manchester, Evans worked as a post-doc at the Stevens Institute of Technology and MIT before going back to Bristol.

The 21st International Workshop on Water Waves and Floating Bodies is dedicated to Evans on the occasion of his retirement.

Selected publications

See also
Wave power

References

External links
International Workshop on Water Waves and Floating Bodies web site

1940 births
Living people
20th-century British mathematicians
21st-century British mathematicians
Academics of the University of Bristol
Fluid dynamicists
Alumni of the University of Manchester